Villa Park is an association football stadium in Birmingham, England

Villa Park may also refer to:

 Villa Park, California, a small city in Orange County
 Villa Park, Illinois, a suburb of Chicago in DuPage County
 Villa Park, Denver, a neighborhood of Denver, Colorado
 Villa Park, Trenton, New Jersey, a neighborhood of Trenton, New Jersey
 Villa Park, Monmouth County, New Jersey, an unincorporated community in Spring Lake Heights